Villagers Film Studio Private Limited is an Indian film production company founded by Ammy Virk and his brother Bhagwant Virk in 2017. Villagers Film Studio began to produce films in 2018 with Laung Laachi followed by Harjeeta and Guddiyan Patole.

History 
Villagers Film Studio was founded by Ammy Virk, Bhagwant Virk, and Nav Virk on 17 November 2017 in Chandigarh, India. Studio began to produce films in 2018 with Laung Laachi. The film was directed by Amberdeep Singh and starred Amberdeep Singh, Neeru Bajwa, and Ammy Virk in lead roles. The film plots the story of a newly married man who shares an unusual relationship with his wife as they decide to live separately as strangers. He sets out to win her heart. The film was commercial success with its music getting most appreciation; it was one of highest-grossing Punjabi films of 2018. The title song of the film sung by Mannat Noor is viewed over 800 million times on YouTube making it most-viewed Indian song of all time. At 9th PTC Punjabi Film Awards, the film won the highest number of awards (four) shared with Qismat, Carry On Jatta 2, and Sajjan Singh Rangroot.

Later, Studio co-produced Harjeeta with Sizzlen Productions, Malika Productions, and Omjee Group. The film was based on the hockey player Harjeet Singh, who was a captain in the Junior Indian Hockey team in World Cup. The film was written by Jagdeep Sidhu and directed by Vijay Kumar Arora. The film was praised by critics as well as audience but was commercially not much successful.

Filmography

In House Group 

In House Group was launched by Ammy Virk in 2019 as a distribution company based in India. The first film distributed by the group was Guddiyan Patole, which was a commercial success both in India and International territories.

Highest-grossing films

Canada

See also 
 Ammy Virk

References 

Indian film studios
Indian companies established in 2017
2017 establishments in Chandigarh
Companies based in Chandigarh